Arkista's Ring is an action-adventure game developed by NMK and published by American Sammy for the Nintendo Entertainment System in 1990. The game is set in a fantasy world where the player controls a female elf named Christine, in her quest to find the titular magic item.

Plot
The Elven ring of Arkista has been stolen by the villainous Shogun, who has cast the entire Elven Kingdom into darkness. The only hope for the Elves is that their strongest warrior, Christine, equipped with only her trusty bow and arrows, can travel throughout the Kingdom and retrieve the ring.

Reception
Allgame's Alan Weiss gave it 3 out of 5 stars, calling it "an extremely pleasant action-adventure game" and drawing parallels to The Legend of Zelda.

References

External links
Arkista's Ring at MobyGames

1990 video games
Action-adventure games
Fantasy video games
Nintendo Entertainment System games
Nintendo Entertainment System-only games
NMK (company) games
North America-exclusive video games
Sammy games
Top-down video games
Video games developed in Japan
Video games featuring female protagonists
Video games scored by Sizlla Okamura